Tashkanan (also Romanized as Tashkānān; also known as Ashkanun, Ţashjānān, Tashkāhenān, and Tashtjānān) is a village in Montazeriyeh Rural District, in the Central District of Tabas County, South Khorasan Province, Iran. At the 2006 census, its population was 233, in 55 families.

References 

Populated places in Tabas County